The Prix Iris for Best Hair is an annual film award, presented by Québec Cinéma as part of its Prix Iris awards program, to honour the year's best hairstyling in films made within the Cinema of Quebec.

The award was presented for the first time at the 7th Jutra Awards in 2005. Prior to its creation, hairstylists could receive nominations in the Best Makeup category.

Until 2016, it was known as the Jutra Award for Best Hair in memory of influential Quebec film director Claude Jutra. Following the withdrawal of Jutra's name from the award, the 2016 award was presented under the name Québec Cinéma. The Prix Iris name was announced in October 2016.

2000s

2010s

2020s

See also
Canadian Screen Award for Best Hair

References

Awards established in 2005
Film awards for makeup and hairstyling
Hair
Quebec-related lists